Dorian Singer is an American football wide receiver for the USC Trojans. He previously played for the Arizona Wildcats.

High school career
Singer attended Tartan Senior High School in Oakdale, Minnesota before transferring to Pinnacle High School in Phoenix, Arizona for his senior year. As a senior, he had 37 receptions for 889 yards and 14 touchdowns. He committed to the University of Arizona to play college football.

College career
As a true freshman at Arizona in 2020, Singer played in five games and had 18 receptions for 301 yards. As a sophomore in 2022, he started 11 of 12 games and had 66 receptions for a Pac-12 leading 1,105 yards and six touchdowns. After the season, he entered the transfer portal and later announced he was transferring to the University of Southern California (USC).

References

External links
Arizona Wildcats bio

Living people
Players of American football from Minnesota
American football wide receivers
Arizona Wildcats football players
USC Trojans football players
Year of birth missing (living people)